Edith Davis may refer to:

 Edith Luckett Davis (1888–1987), American actress and mother-in-law of US president Ronald Reagan
 Edith Smith Davis (1859–1918), leader in the temperance movement